The silvery-throated spinetail (Synallaxis subpudica) is a species of bird in the family Furnariidae. It is endemic to Colombia.

Its natural habitats are subtropical or tropical moist montane forests and heavily degraded former forest.

References

External links

silvery-throated spinetail
Birds of the Colombian Andes
Endemic birds of Colombia
silvery-throated spinetail
silvery-throated spinetail
Taxonomy articles created by Polbot